Cuddalore Central Prison is located in Cuddalore, India. The prison was built during 1865 and initially used for housing mentally challenged people. It was converted into a prison for habitual offenders in 1986. The poet Subramanya Bharathi was confined in this prison during the freedom struggle from 20 September 1918 to 14 December 1918. The prison is authorised to accommodate 723 prisoners. It is first jail in Tamil Nadu

External links 
Tamil Nadu Prison Department

Prisons in Tamil Nadu
Cuddalore
Buildings and structures completed in 1865
1986 establishments in Tamil Nadu